Robert Gordon Oliver (born 3 January 1950) is a former road and track cyclist from New Zealand, who represented his native country in the individual road race at the 1972 Summer Olympics in Munich, West Germany.

References

External links
 Profile New Zealand Olympic Committee

1950 births
Living people
New Zealand male cyclists
Cyclists at the 1972 Summer Olympics
Olympic cyclists of New Zealand
Sportspeople from Wellington City